The 1922 East Tennessee State Normal School football team was an American football team that represented East Tennessee State Normal School—now known as East Tennessee State University (ETSU)—as an independent in the 1922 college football season. They were coached by first-year head coach James Karl Luck, a University of Tennessee graduate who taught agriculture and also coached basketball at the school. He was assisted by fellow teacher  A. V. McFee, who is credited as serving as the team's first trainer. Half of the team's player that never played football before. East Tennessee State Normal School finished the season a 3–4 record (5–4 with non-countable opponents). The season was highlighted by a 3–0 upset of cross-county rival  on Thanksgiving Day in front of a crowd of 3,000 at Wilder Park.

Schedule

References

East Tennessee State Normal
East Tennessee State Buccaneers football seasons
East Tennessee State Normal football